The 2019–20 Women’s Euro Hockey Tour was the second season of the six-team Women's Euro Hockey Tour (EHT) format, originally implemented in the 2018–19 season. It was played over four tournaments: a four nation tournament in Finland, a five nation tournament in Russia, a four nation tournament in Germany, and concluded with a six nation tournament in Sweden. The women’s national teams from the Czech Republic, Finland, Germany, Japan, Russia, Sweden, and Switzerland participated in at least one tournament; Finland was the only national team to participate in all four tournaments.

The boycott staged by the players of the Swedish women's national team (Damkronorna) against the Swedish Ice Hockey Association (SIF) concerning, among other issues, player treatment and team conditions, necessitated adjustments in two of the EHT tournaments in the 2019–20 season. The Swedish players announced the boycott on 14 August 2019, days before they were scheduled to compete in the first Euro Hockey Tour tournament of the season, and quick reshuffling of the tournament was required. The boycott was ended on 14 October 2019, when the players’ union and the SIF agreed to new terms and conditions for the national team, principally concerning compensation for lost earnings while participating in national team training and competition and a guarantee of full insurance coverage for any injuries sustained while playing with Damkronorna, among others. The team’s much delayed training camp was held during 4–8 November 2019 and the conflicting dates caused the Swedes to cancel their participation in the EHT tournament in Dmitrov held during 6–10 November 2019. The Swedish national team appeared in the remaining two tournaments as scheduled.

Four Nations Tournament in Vierumäki
The 2019–20 season began with a Euro Hockey Tour tournament in Vierumäki, a four nations tournament (also stylized as “4 nations tournament”) featuring the national teams from the Czech Republic, Finland, Japan, and Russia. It was principally played in Vierumäki, Finland, with single matches being played in Kerava, and Mikkeli, during 18–24 August 2019. Sweden cancelled its participation in the tournament due to the ongoing boycott of the national team players. Finland swept the tournament to claim a decisive victory for the host nation.

Standings

Results
All times local, UTC+2.

Top Scorers
 Petra Nieminen, 7 points (5+2)
 Jenni Hiirikoski, 7 points (2+5)
 Noora Tulus, 6 points (1+5)
 Michelle Karvinen, 5 points (2+3)
 Hanae Kubo, 4 points (2+2)

Source: Finnish Ice Hockey Association

Top Goaltenders
 Meeri Räisänen, 97.4% save percentage
 Nana Fujimoto, 94.9% save percentage
 Eveliina Suonpää, 92.0% save percentage
 Nadezhda Morozova, 90.9% save percentage
 Valeria Merkusheva, 90.0% save percentage

Source: Finnish Ice Hockey Association

Individual awards 
 Best Goaltender:  Meeri Räisänen
 Best Defender:  Jenni Hiirikoski
 Best Forward:  Olga Sosina

Source: IIHF

Five Nations Tournament in Dmitrov
The Five Nations Tournament in Dmitrov (also stylized as “5 Nations Tournament”) was played during 6–10 November 2019 at Dmitrov Arena in Dmitrov, Russia. The tournament was dedicated to the 25th anniversary of women's ice hockey in Russia. The women's national teams from the Czech Republic, Finland, Germany, Russia, and Switzerland participated; the Swedish national team declined to join the tournament as they had ended their boycott only several weeks prior and were in the midst of training camp at the time of the tournament. The Czech Republic were victorious in all of their matches and won the tournament.

Standings

Results
All times local, UTC+3

Top Scorers
 Alena Mills, 6 points (3+3)
 Minnamari Tuominen, 6 points (2+4)
 Klára Hymlárová, 6 points (1+5)
 Nina Pirogova, 6 points (0+6)
 Yelena Provorova, 5 points (3+2)

Source: Finnish Ice Hockey Association

Individual awards 
Best Players of the Tournament
 Best Goaltender:  Klára Peslarová
 Best Skater(s):  Alena Mills,  Olga Sosina

 Source: Czech Ice Hockey Association

Four Nations Tournament in Füssen
The Four Nations Tournament in Füssen (also stylized as “4 Nations Tournament”) was held 8–12 December 2019 at the Bundesleistungszentrum (BLZ-Arena) in Füssen, Germany. The Swiss team had an impressive showing and were surprise champions of the tournament.

Standings

Results

Leading Scorers
  Lara Stalder, 6 points (4+2)
  Alina Müller, 5 points (3+2)
  Laura Kluge, 5 points (1+4)
  Dominique Rüegg, 4 points (3+1) Noora Tulus, 4 points (3+1)
  Rahel Enzler, 4 points (1+3)

Source: German Ice Hockey Federation 

Leading Goaltenders

  Sara Grahn, 93.6% Save percentage
  Saskia Maurer, 90.0% save percentage
  Jennifer Harß, 87.5% save percentage
  Meeri Räisänen, 83.3% save percentage
  Jenna Silvonen, 81.3% save percentage

Source: Finnish Ice Hockey Association

Individual awards
Best Players of the Tournament

 Best Goaltender:  Jennifer Harß
 Best Defender:  Minnamari Tuominen
 Best Forward:  Lara Stalder

Six Nations Tournament in Sweden
The 2019–20 Euro Hockey Tour Play Off (alternatively called the 2019–20 Euro Hockey Tour Finals or Six Nations Tournament in Tranås and Eksjö, also stylized as “6 Nations Tournament”) was played during 5–8 February 2020 in Eksjö and Tranås, Sweden. The tournament featured the national teams from the Czech Republic, Finland, Germany, Russia, Sweden, and Switzerland, and was played over two rounds, a group stage followed by the final placement matches. In the group stage, the teams were divided into groups of three and played a single round robin to determine their positions for the finals. Group A included Finland, Germany, and Switzerland and its matches were played at Storgårdshallen in Eksjö. Group B included the Czech Republic, Russia, and Sweden and its matches were played at Stiga Arena in Tranås. The final placement matches were played at Stiga Arena in Tranås. The Czech Republic faced Germany in the fifth place match, Russia faced Switzerland in the third place match, and Finland faced Sweden in the first place match. Finland won the match against Sweden to become the 2019–2020 Euro Hockey Tour champions.

Standings

Results

Group A

Group B

Finals

Fifth Place Game

Third-place game

Final

Leading Scorers of the Tournament

 Petra Nieminen, 8 points (3+5)
 Susanna Tapani, 8 points (1+7)
 Michelle Karvinen, 7 points (4+3)
 Anna Shokhina, 5 points (1+4)
 Jenni Hiirikoski, 4 points (1+3)

Source: Swedish Ice Hockey Association

Leading Goaltenders of the Tournament
 Klára Peslarová, 96.23% save percentage
 Noora Räty, 92.59% save percentage
 Jennifer Harß, 92.54% save percentage
 Sara Grahn, 90.74% save percentage
 Saskia Maurer, 89.04% save percentage

Source: Swedish Ice Hockey Association

Individual awards
Best Players of the Tournament
 Best Goaltender:  Klára Peslarová
 Best Defender:  Jenni Hiirikoski
 Best Forward:  Anna Shokhina

Source: Swedish Ice Hockey Association

References

=Game references

Women's ice hockey tournaments
Women's EHT
Euro Hockey Tour
Sport in Heinola
Sport in Moscow Oblast
Sport in Füssen
Sport in Jönköping County